St. George is a town in Chittenden County, Vermont, United States. The town was named for the patron saint of England. St. George has the smallest land area of any town in Vermont, though the incorporated cities of St. Albans, Vergennes, and Winooski are smaller. The population was 794 at the 2020 census.

Geography
St. George is bordered by the town of Shelburne to the west, Williston to the northeast, and Hinesburg to the south. The southwest part of St. George comprises the St. George census-designated place.

Demographics

As of the census of 2000, there were 698 people, 264 households, and 200 families residing in the town. The population density was 194.5 people per square mile (75.1/km2). There were 277 housing units at an average density of 77.2 per square mile (29.8/km2). The racial makeup of the town was 98.14% White, 0.57% African American, 0.14% Native American, and 1.15% from two or more races. Hispanic or Latino of any race were 1.15% of the population.

There were 264 households, out of which 43.6% had children under the age of 18 living with them, 58.0% were married couples living together, 10.6% had a female householder with no husband present, and 24.2% were non-families. 18.6% of all households were made up of individuals, and 4.9% had someone living alone who was 65 years of age or older. The average household size was 2.64 and the average family size was 2.97.

In the town, the population was spread out, with 29.9% under the age of 18, 6.7% from 18 to 24, 33.8% from 25 to 44, 22.8% from 45 to 64, and 6.7% who were 65 years of age or older. The median age was 34 years. For every 100 females, there were 105.3 males. For every 100 females age 18 and over, there were 103.8 males.

The median income for a household in the town was $44,028, and the median income for a family was $43,438. Males had a median income of $33,036 versus $24,375 for females. The per capita income for the town was $22,882. About 7.5% of families and 8.9% of the population were below the poverty line, including 13.7% of those under age 18 and none of those age 65 or over.

Notable people

 Jean Ankeney, Vermont state senator

References

External links
 Town of St. George official website

 
Saint George, Vermont
Burlington, Vermont metropolitan area
Saint George, Vermont